Cedrik-Marcel Stebe was the defending champion but decided not to participate.
Lu Yen-hsun defeated Peter Gojowczyk 7–5, 6–0 in the final to win the tournament.

Seeds

Draw

Finals

Top half

Bottom half

References
 Main Draw
 Qualifying Draw

Shanghai Challenger - Singles
2012 Singles